Naeem Abbas Rufi is a Pakistani singer. He is known as a band singer in morning shows Utho Jago Pakistan and Mazaaq Raat.

Career
Naeem Abbas Rufi emerged as a Pakistani singer in the early 1990s both on Pakistani television and in the Pakistani film industry. Before that, he made a name for himself by taking part in amateur singing competitions. At the age of 12, he was featured in a children's TV show 'Sung Sung Chalay' conducted by the music composer Sohail Rana.

Coke Studio (Pakistan) artist
Rufi's has released three albums including an album dedicated to Nusrat Fateh Ali Khan. He is also an established playback singer in television and film industry. In 2016, Rufi marked his Coke Studio debut as a featured artist in season 9, as a part of the team with Shuja Haider and Meesha Shafi.

Filmography

TV
 Utho Jago Pakistan
 Ishq Ki Inteha
 Mora Piya 
 Mazaaq Raat
 Maaye Ni

Coke Studio
Rufi made his debut in Coke Studio's season 9.
 Aaya Laariye (o darling bride) duet with Meesha Shafi - episode 4, season 9

Discography
 Kawaan
 Zamana
 A Tribute To Nusrat Fateh Ali Khan

References

External links
 Naeem Abbas Rufi at Patari 
 Naeem Abbas Rufi at iTunes

21st-century Pakistani male singers
Living people
Singers from Karachi
Muhajir people
Year of birth missing (living people)
Coke Studio (Pakistani TV program)